HMS Active is a planned Type 31 frigate and the thirteenth vessel of the Royal Navy to carry the name. In May 2021, the names of the five planned Type 31 ships were announced by the First Sea Lord. The names were selected to represent key themes that represent the future plans of the Royal Navy and Royal Marines - forward deployment of ships overseas; operating in the North Atlantic; carrier operations; technology and innovation; and the Future Commando Force.

Active, named after the Type 21 frigate which served in the Falklands War, symbolises forward deployment of ships overseas. The plan for the Type 31 project envisages all five units of the class being in service by February 2030.

Construction
Construction of HMS Active began with a steel cutting ceremony at Rosyth Dockyard on 23 January 2023. The ceremony was attended by dignitaries and veterans who served on her namesake during the Falklands War. The ship will be built within the Venturer Hall which can build two ships in parallel.

References

Proposed ships of the Royal Navy
Type 31 frigates